The  Maksym Zalizniak oak tree is a natural monument  in Ukraine. The tree took 3rd prize in the "National Tree of Ukraine"  national competition in 2010. Being over 1,100 year old, it is one of the oldest and biggest trees in Ukraine and Europe. It is named after Maksym Zalizniak, a leader of the Koliivshchyna rebellion of haidamaks  in 1768.

References

External links 
 NHCP "Chyhyryn" site  (Ukrainian)
 Maksym Zaliznyak Oak
 1100 Years Old Oak
 NHCP "Chyhyryn" guide
 Millennial oak in Kholodnyi Yar  continues to grow (photo)  (Ukrainian)

National Historical and Cultural Preserve "Chyhyryn"
Individual trees in Ukraine
Individual oak trees